Sweatshop-free or sweat free is a term first used by American Apparel, a famous American clothing brand, which means coercion-free, fair-compensation for the garment workers who manufacture their products. The aim of sweatshop-free wish to ensure that all employees are treated fairly and products are made in good working conditions. Sweatshop-free standards include the right to collective bargaining, non-poverty wages, safe workplaces, back wages, and non-harassment. It has been heavily featured in American Apparel’s advertisements and become a common term in the garment industry.

Versus sweatshop

Sweatshop
A sweatshop is a factory or workplace, that can be specific to clothing, where employees are paid very little for a lot of work in bad conditions. Several sweatshop companies in developing nations, including India, China, Cambodia, Indonesia, Vietnam, and Bangladesh, hire low-paid labor or even small children between the ages 10-14 to work in their factories. These employees put in about 16 hours a day, seven days a week. Their employers do not provide them with any essential benefits, such as health care insurance, maternity leave, sick pay, or holiday pay. In hopes to prevent maternity leave they will occasionally require female employees to use birth control and regularly check for pregnancy. The hourly pay for these workers is only 25p an hour, which is less than the federal minimum wage. Even though laborers put in long hours every day, their pay will typically only covers the necessities of existence. 

Sweatshop factories usually have harsh working conditions. For example: no rest break or air-conditioning, and workers have to stand for their entire shift. Some workers even have to work in unsafe and hazardous conditions which may cause working injuries or even fatal factory incidents. Take China as an example, in 2009 alone, approximately one million workers were injured at work and about 20,000 suffered from diseases due to their occupation. The reason for this is that the sweatshop factories did not provide any safety guidance for their employees. Many sweatshop workers also suffer from labour abuse, sexual harassment and discrimination in their workplaces. To avoid labours organizing protests or any campaign against unfair labour practices, many sweatshop factories find ways to prevent the establishment of the trade unions.

Alongside this, these conditions did not discontinue during the pandemic. In fact, the COVID-19 Pandemic worsened these appalling conditions with poverty pay. The actions of huge Western brands boost their profit margins continue to condemn millions of garment workers to the threat of starvation and destitution.

Sweatshop-free
In a sweatshop, labours have to work for long hours but receive very low salary which is only half or even less than the legal minimum wage under a harsh working condition. The aim of sweatshop-free wish to ensure that all employees are treated fairly and products are made in good working conditions. Sweatshop-free standards include the right to collective bargaining, non-poverty wages, safe workplaces, back wages, and non-harassment.

American Apparel, for example, provides all employees and their families a range of employee benefits including health insurance, parking, subsidized public transport, subsidized lunches, free on-site massages, a bike-lending program, a program of paid days off as well as opening an on-site medical clinic for their employees. American Apparel makes sure that their workers are treated fairly and working in a good working conditions. The average employee would earn $25,000 per year, at $12 per hour.

Sweatshop scandals

Apple Inc.

Apple Inc  the world's most valuable technology multinational corporation has been accused that their contractors are forcing workers to do overtime involuntarily at sweatshop working conditions and employing underage workers in its factories. Some laborers are forced to work 24 hours at a time and others are forced to stand for their entire shift. And some workers even had to work at unsafe and hazardous condition. In December 2011, 61 workers in the Riteng Computer Accessory Co factory were injured in a gas explosion whilst trialling aluminum iPad 2 back panels. Due to the pressurized working conditions, in 2009, 18 workers who work in Foxconn factory, one of the Apple manufacturer, committed suicide after losing an iPhone prototype. Over next two years, at least 18 other Apple workers try to commit suicide. Besides, undercover Inspectors have been monitoring Pegatron factory, one of the Apple contractor in Taiwan, for five months and found Apple supplier broke 86 laws and regulations including workers are forced to work up to 70 hours per week as well as hiring more than 100,000 underage labour to work on the production lines. These sweatshop scandals strongly affected the reputation of the company.  A lot their workers were not only underage, but many if not all were undocumented and weren't able to speak English. This making them an easy target for these companies.

Primark
Primark, a leading high street fashion chain, has been blamed that three of its Indian suppliers are using child labour in their factories. After BBC Panorama’s six months undercover investigation, they discovered the Indian suppliers were sub-contracting middlemen who employed children at Bhavanisagar refugee camp. Investigators found a 9-year-old boy who is working in the refugee camp sweatshop “Sometimes we get major orders in and we have to work double quick. I get paid a few rupees for finishing each garment, but in a good day I can make 40 rupees (60p)” and “The beads we sew are very small and when we work late at night we have to work by candle - the electricity in the camp is poor.”  Primark sub-contractors hired young children to work under poor working conditions, paying them as little as 13p an hour and they have to work up to 48 hours a week. After BBC Panorama investigation discovered that the Indian suppliers had used child labour to carry out embroidery and sequin work, Primark then fired the Indian suppliers.

BBC also reported that TNS Knitwear, a Manchester-based supplier that provide Primark with about 20,000 garment a week, was not only employing illegal immigrants from Pakistan, Afghanistan and India, but also paying them as little as £3 per hour which is well below than the legal minimum wage but the company has denied all the allegations.

Sweatshop-free legislation and activism
The contemporary anti sweatshop movement first began in 1993 and aimed to target large apparel, textile, and footwear corporations that still used sweatshops for labor. This movement was crucial as it was the forefront of activists targeting and shaming large corporations and spawned a movement that would change the way Americans view Consumerism. As working conditions decreased, activism arose, and the sweatshop-free movement grew and soon caused the implementation of laws and sanctions to protect workers. 

In October 2008, the City of Portland, Oregon passed the "City of Portland Sweatshop Free Procurement Policy”  which is the pacific northwest’s first city to adopt this policy. Portland Sweatshop-Free Purchasing Policy requires the local apparel manufacturers to guarantee their garments were produced in workplaces free of sweatshop conditions. Local apparel manufacturers have to disclose their manufacturing facility locations and meet ethical sourcing practices. Apart from monitoring the local apparel manufacturers, the city also participates and collaborates with public agencies and other non-profit organizations to promote sweatshop free procurement practices  which is institutionalizing meaningful change. A not-for-profit organization called SweatsHops  aims to produce ethical factories in Kolkata, India to stop human trafficking (women and children), and also aims to create an ethical place of work for the victims of abuse, freeing them from sex trade. This workplace will become a place of refuge, education, childcare and provide a decent wage. They believe shutting down one sweatshop will only create fewer jobs for people who are already struggling with employment, or that another sweatshop will just open up next door. Retailers are always trying to get cheaper manufacturing costs, this is why we need to stand up and demand ethical treatment and wages for staff. If the consumers demand this, and demand an ‘open book’ of their suppliers, we will create a sweatshop-free world.

See also
 Sweatshop
 Anti-sweatshop
 Child labour
 Minimum wage
 Exploitation of labor
 National Anti-Sweating League
 Nike sweatshops
 Protectionism

References

Fair trade